The 16th Division was an infantry division of the United States Army raised during World War I. It was the second formation of that name raised in the United States, the first being renamed to 37th Division in 1917.

History
The division was organized in 1918 as a regular army and national army division for World War I, and was commanded by Major General David C. Shanks, with Stephen J. Chamberlin, later a lieutenant general, as division Chief of Staff. Its two Infantry brigades, the 31st and 32nd, were commanded by Peter Weimer Davison and Walter Cowen Short. The division's 16th Field Artillery Brigade was commanded by Daniel W. Hand.

The Armistice occurred before the 16th Division departed for France; under the command of Guy Carleton, it was briefly considered for inclusion in American Expeditionary Force Siberia, but that conflict also ended before the division could embark.  It did not go overseas and demobilized in March 1919 at Camp Kearny, California.

Because the 16th Division was in existence for such a brief period, it never designed or adopted a shoulder sleeve insignia or distinctive unit insignia.

References

External links
16th Division Association

United States Army divisions of World War I
Military units and formations established in 1917
Military units and formations disestablished in 1919